Pravaham is a 1975 Indian Malayalam-language film, directed by J. Sasikumar and produced by R. Somanathan. The film stars Prem Nazir, Vidhubala, Adoor Bhasi and Prema. The film's score was composed by M. K. Arjunan. 
 The film was a remake of Tamil film Thayilla Pillai.

Cast
 
Prem Nazir 
Vidhubala 
Adoor Bhasi 
Prema 
Sankaradi 
Sreelatha Namboothiri 
T. S. Muthaiah 
Reena 
Vincent

Soundtrack
The music was composed by M. K. Arjunan.

References

External links
  
 

1975 films
1970s Malayalam-language films
Malayalam remakes of Tamil films
Films directed by J. Sasikumar